María Esther Gamas (21 April 1911 – 21 September 2006) was an Argentine stage and film actress. She appeared in 20 films, including Savage Pampas (1945), and was one of the stars of the Golden Age of Argentine Cinema.

Biography
María Esther was born to a Chilean mother and a Galician father in Santa Fe. She was married to musician Roberto Fugazot, with whom she had a daughter, María Rosa Fugazot, who is also an actress.

Selected filmography
 By the Light of a Star (1941)
 When the Heart Sings (1941)
 Savage Pampas (1945)
 Rhythm, Salt and Pepper (1951)

References

Bibliography 
 Finkielman, Jorge. The Film Industry in Argentina: An Illustrated Cultural History. McFarland, 24 December 2003.

External links 
 

1911 births
2006 deaths
Actresses from Rosario, Santa Fe
Argentine film actresses
Argentine people of Chilean descent
Argentine people of Galician descent
Argentine stage actresses
20th-century Argentine actresses